Wohin? is a 1988 West German drama film directed by Herbert Achternbusch. It was entered into the 38th Berlin International Film Festival.

Cast
 Franz Baumgartner as Franz
 Annamirl Bierbichler
 Josef Bierbichler as Skunk
 Gunter Freyse as Gunter
 Gabi Geist as Gabi
 Kurt Raab as Gast

References

External links

1988 films
1988 drama films
1980s German-language films
West German films
Films directed by Herbert Achternbusch
1980s German films